Edenryd is a village in Bromölla Municipality in Skåne, Sweden.

Swedish singer Sanna Nielsen was born and raised in Edenryd.

References

Villages in Sweden